Gregory Romero "Greg" Wilson, (born November 12), better known by the stage name The Greg Wilson, is an American stand-up comedian and actor, based in Los Angeles. He is best known for his role as Arno Blount in the 2008 movie The Hottie and the Nottie.

Career

Greg Wilson got his start in comedy when Phil Larsson heard of him, and added him as a member of the Dallas improv theater group Ad-Libs. He went on to develop his own shows: The Comedy Madhouse in Las Vegas and later The Greg Wilson's Stand-Up|Smackdown! in New York City.

Currently based in Los Angeles, Wilson has performed in venues such as The Laugh Factory and Stand Up NY. On television, he has made appearances in several stand-up comedy shows and specials, including Showtime's White Boyz in the Hood, Comics Unleashed, and Comedy.tv, and was featured in an episode of the reality show Who Wants to Date a Comedian?. From 2012 to 2013, he was a cast member on World's Dumbest.... He also co-hosts the podcast Hot N' Heavy, along with model Angie Everhart.

Wilson runs a stand-up comedy academy, The Comedy Institute. In it, he offers courses on storytelling, handing hecklers, and other skills necessary for a stand-up comedian, as well as a master class on "Mastering Stand-Up".

As an actor, Wilson has appeared in television series such as Bones, Ugly Betty, and Modern Family, usually in small, episodic roles, as well as commercials for Heineken and Toyota, among other brands. In 2008, Wilson landed a starring role in the romantic comedy film The Hottie and the Nottie, opposite Paris Hilton and Joel David Moore. He portrayed Arno Blount, the male lead's quirky childhood friend. The film was a box office bomb and received universally negative reviews, and has been cited as one of the worst films ever made.

Notable voice acting roles include the character JD O'Toole in the video game Grand Theft Auto: Liberty City Stories and the eponymous Mr. Two in the animated Nickelodeon pilot Charlie and Mr. Two.

Controversy

On April 26, 2013, /Film writer Peter Sciretta claimed Wilson had been publicly accused of joke theft during a taping of America's Got Talent. Allegedly, Wilson auditioned for the talent show with a comedy act involving a mimed reenactment of an argument between a married couple. During the subsequent evaluation by the show's jury, judge Howie Mandel
mentioned having previously witnessed a strikingly similar act being performed by comedian Frank Nicotero, who had been hired as a warm-up comedian for the program and was present during the taping. Wilson denied having stolen the material. Although the judges decided to advance Wilson to the next round nonetheless, he was later disqualified and the footage was never aired.

Both Nicotero and Wilson later confirmed Sciretta's account of the events.

Filmography

Film

Television

Video games

Discography
 Pottymouth (2007)
 Hollywood Legend & Sex Symbol (2010)

Bibliography
 Wilson, Greg. The Complete Guide to Stand-up: Everything you need to know, from open-mics to going pro!

References

External links

 of The Comedy Institute.

Year of birth missing (living people)
Living people
American stand-up comedians
American male film actors
American male television actors
American male video game actors
American male voice actors
Male actors from Dallas
20th-century American male actors
21st-century American male actors
20th-century American comedians
21st-century American comedians